Whitemail, coined as an opposite to blackmail, has several meanings.

Economics 

In economics, whitemail is an anti-takeover arrangement in which the target company will sell significantly discounted stock to a friendly third party. In return, the target company helps thwart takeover attempts, by
 raising the acquisition price of the raider
 diluting the hostile bidder's number of shares
 increasing the aggregate stock holdings of the company

Social culture 

Whitemail can also be considered as legally compensating someone for doing their job in a manner benefiting the payer. For example, if a person gives a maître d' a $20 bill in order to secure a table more quickly than other patrons who had arrived earlier, this could be considered whitemail. It is merely a compensatory incentive for someone to do their job quicker, better, or in a manner more advantageous to the payer. It can be considered a bribe, depending on the person being offered the incentive and the action the incentive is intended to influence.

Fiction 

In Terry Pratchett's Discworld series, whitemail is described as an anti-crime, a positive act that is committed in such a way as to cause outrage and/or humiliation to its victim.  Whitemail is the threat of disclosing a person's good deeds for purposes of undermining their disreputable reputation (e.g. a gangster's charitable donation). Other anti-crimes include breaking-and-decorating and proffering-with-embarrassment.

Fundraising 

In fundraising, whitemail is a donation received without a response form, coupon, statement, or other source identification, so it cannot be attributed to any particular fundraising campaign.  These donations often come in generic, white-colored envelopes.

E-mail 

1) Automated inbound fax and letter handling: Whitemail can used to refer to the automated handling of inbound faxes and letters as customer requests to, and at, service and reception desks. For example, KANA Whitemail uses this terminology and is a provider of software to integrate Customer Relations Management (CRM) systems with email clients.

2) White listed email: Whitemail can be used as a term to denote email that is sent through a white listed email service (e.g. iContact, Constant Contact, Get Response, and others). This type of email usually requires mailing list approval or double opt-in by the email recipients. This has a higher deliverability than normal direct email lists and is usually used for the delivery of newsletters or other regular information distributed to clients or subscribers.

3) Anonymous email: Whitemail was an anonymous mailer hosted on biomatic.org. It would allow any visitor to send e-mail messages to any address at no cost and with no registration required, simply using the site's interface.  Whitemail even allowed its users to provide any e-mail address (their own, somebody else's or one that does not exist) that would then appear to the recipient as the message's origin. The Whitemail service was removed from the site at version 3 in 2004

References

External links
 

Mergers and acquisitions
Social engineering (computer security)
Webmail